Joseph Boyer de Rébeval (20 April 1768 – 5 March 1822) became a French division commander during the later Napoleonic Wars. He enlisted in the French Royal Army in 1787 and earned promotions through the ranks in the War of the First Coalition and subsequent conflicts. He was wounded at Valvasone in March 1797. He emerged as a major in the Vélites of the Imperial Guard in 1806 and fought at Kolberg in 1807. He was promoted colonel of the 2nd Foot Chasseurs of the Guard in 1808. He fought at Wagram in 1809, winning promotion to general of brigade. He was wounded at Borodino in 1812. He commanded a Young Guard brigade at Dresden and Leipzig in 1813 and was promoted to general of division. He led a Young Guard division at Craonne, where he was wounded, and at Laon, Reims and Arcis-sur-Aube in 1814. During the Hundred Days he commanded units of the Imperial Guard at Waterloo in 1815 and retired soon afterward.

References

1768 births
1822 deaths
French generals
French military personnel of the French Revolutionary Wars
French commanders of the Napoleonic Wars
People from Vaucouleurs
Barons of the First French Empire
Commandeurs of the Légion d'honneur
Burials at Père Lachaise Cemetery